The Malaysian Rally, known previously as Rally Malaysia and Rally of Malaysia, is a rally racing event held in the state of Johor, at the southern tip of Peninsular Malaysia. The rally is based out of the state capital Johor Bahru.

An earlier version of the Malaysian Rally was called "The South Malaysia Rally". organized by the Singapore Motor Club, the first event was held in 1964. Records on hand do not include the inaugural event but the South Malaysian Rally was held at least through 1969. The SMC was closely involved with the Forces Driving Club in Singapore, and many of the rallies were jointly produced, with competitors from both clubs. Records on hand record the following winners:
 
1965 and 1966 - John & Audrey Piggott, Saab 99 
1967 - "Dickie" Arblaster & Charles Green, Austin 1800
1968 - Joe Minto & Derek Pattinson, Toyota Corona
1969 - Derek Minto & David Appleyard, Opel Kadett

The rally was first held in the mid-1970s, a legacy of British colonial influence in Malaysia and has been a long running part of the Malaysian Rally Championship and the Asia-Pacific Rally Championship. The long history of rallying in the region has seen Malaysian drivers emerge with Karamjit Singh winning the rally in 2001 before going on to become a three-time Asia-Pacific champion. Malaysian manufacturer Proton Cars has also used the rally to show off its products, both the badge-engineered Proton Pert and its own design the Proton Satria. The rally has proven to be a happy hunting ground for Australians with both Ross Dunkerton and Cody Crocker winning the rally four years running.

List of winners
Sourced in part from:

References

External links
Official website
Asia Pacific Championship

Rally competitions in Malaysia
Malaysia
Sport in Johor